Babyntsi is an urban-type settlement in Bucha Raion (district) of Kyiv Oblast (province) in northern Ukraine. It belongs to Bucha urban hromada, one of the hromadas of Ukraine. The population of the settlement was 2,627 as of the 2001 Ukrainian Census. Current population: .

Babyntsi has the status of an urban-type settlement since 1938.

Until 18 July 2020, Babyntsi belonged to Borodianka Raion. The raion was abolished that day as part of the administrative reform of Ukraine, which reduced the number of raions of Kyiv Oblast to seven. The area of Borodianka Raion was merged into Bucha Raion.

Geography
River Hnilovid, the right tributary of the Zdvizh, flows through the village.

Notable people
 Anna Didenko — Ukrainian artist, member of the National Union of Artists of Ukraine.

References

Urban-type settlements in Bucha Raion
Populated places established in 1938